Georgeta Năpăruș (23 October 1930 – 9 July 1997) was a Romanian modernist painter.

Early life and education

Born in 1930 to Angela Năpăruș (née Pǎdurice) and Vasile Năpăruș (b. 1901) in Comarnic, a small town on the main thoroughfare between Bucharest  and Transylvania, Geta (the short form of Georgeta) lived her youth in one of the most tormented eras for the country, and Europe in general. The valley was already industrial, but the family owned a house on the hills in Secăria, where some traits of ancestral rural life were still alive. The father's family elders were loggers in the mountain, but Vasile was a clerk with the mayor's office. Even though not college educated, he had a radio in the twenties and loved opera, cats and good food. The mother, a housewife,  was a more stern figure, but she was practicing occasionally a mild form of traditional charms, in fact a form of therapy, aimed mostly at consoling young wives with marital woes from the neighborhood. Still, Georgeta's spirit was always blending a quiet, intuitive and nonverbal magical form of expression coming from the mother, with the more exuberant side from the father. Her only brother, Șerban, four years older, later to be a civil engineer, was putting up puppet shows with ghost stories to scare her and together with the father they were casting themselves and the ten cats the family owned into various children's plays.

The transition – from pastoral economy to industrial boomtown, from peace to war, from traditional kingdom to communist trauma – marked the artist in a subtle way. Her creativity always floated in a mysterious space at the same time below the storm and transcending it. She used to believe that being a woman helped: it was sometimes easier not to have to take sides. Her strength is exactly in the natural way of recasting the old – as in most motifs with folkloric roots – into the free form of modernism, without intentionally aiming at it. In a time of political strife and extreme pressures, she managed the extraordinary transition between Romanian peasant embroidery and a form of mythological expressionism.

She went to high school in Sinaia, twenty minutes away by train, but as it happened, in an elite school in the town where stands the glamorous Peleș Castle, built by the royal family. The school was open to the common public in a twist for a society berated later on by the Stalinist propaganda for its inequality. Even here, she attaches herself to artistic characters, like her long time friend Ilinca Cherbatchev, daughter of a Russian White Army general and Romanian nobility from the mother side, who became a musician, a few teachers that spot her talent, in spite of endless terror exerted by math and science, and a young athlete whom she fell in love with and encouraged her to draw and paint. The family was incredulous and frankly appalled at the prospect of her doing art. Essentially running away, she enters the Fine Arts Institute "Nicolae Grigorescu", the top art school in the country, in 1951. Without preparation, she secures a provisional admittance. The time spent in school during the painful years of the darkest era of the "proletarian revolution" is under the sequence of art classes of professors Corina Lecca, Titina Călugăru,  and Adina Paula Moscu.
In 1957 she defends her B.A. with Rudolf Schweitzer-Cumpăna, presenting as diploma work the painting titled Rug weavers (in Romanian: Țesătoare de covoare), apparently lost.

The painter worked all these years without a steady employment, achieving the blessed state of never having a state job at a time when being unemployed was illegal. Surprisingly, this was possible due to the affiliation with the Artist's Guild, an institution that marked deeply the artistic milieu during the forty years before 1989. She was active, participated in major exhibitions, the Salonul Anual, but there was no breakthrough. She married Petre Sava Băleanu, a young television show director; the marriage does not last long, but they divorce much later, remaining friends, including with her future husband Octav, until his premature death in 1976.

During her early years she has a studio on Iulia Hasdeu street, and is friends with many artists of her generation. When she meets again Octav Grigorescu, with whom she was in art school but never got very close to, they marry. In 1966 they settle in one of the studios in Pangrati Street, across from the Romanian Television broadcasting building, in an upscale, and very green, area of Bucharest. It was regarded an achievement, ironically similar to tenure in academia, a coming of age. Perhaps the most extraordinary are the neighbors, all artists older or from the same generation, and later on, a sense of vaguely protected "island of freedom", that survived even the bleakest moments of the eighties, when the regime approached slowly and painfully its demise.

However, from 1965 to 1973, and less so a few years before and after, the country undergoes a great opening, a relaxation after the communist repression of the fifties; it is the short spring that almost brought a sense of normalization. Artists are no longer expected to produce proletarian (proletcultist art) dictated art. Travel in the West is easier and a generation of artists discovers that, in fact, they can be synchronous with the rest of the world. Before that she had traveled to Prague, East Berlin and neighboring countries. She now travels to Italy, and her husband was at the Venice Biennale in 1968; but their works were already participating, mostly in group shows, all over the world.

In 1967 she has a son. Motherhood is a recurrent theme of her work, both as a marker of vitality, feminine imaginary and aspiration; perhaps, as a refuge as well. It is not explored enough how much the rites of life account for her subjects: the bride, the groom, and their derivatives: the prince, as a version of the groom, and the doll, the many dolls, en lieu of the bride. The prince could be the son, the one who replaces an unavowed disappointment in the man. The doll bridges the gap between artisanship and a girl's quiet encasing in a role. Dolls are in a display, a grid, decorative and plural, possibly akin to the canonical representations of orthodox icons, whereas the prince is mostly central, only never fully shaped, evasive but showy. There is a third layer of distance, when the horse replaces even the prince, and the tortoise the female characters, remaining as the deep water metaphor of the artist's conscience. She does not really theorize these roles, yet there is a consistency of the dream. Geta Năpăruș is a genuine artist, she natively depicts a philosophy because there is a conduct between her feelings and her hand, and not between her mind and her artistry.

Her paintings are fewer and larger than in her most creative period, yet to come. Surfaces are still clean, contours try to emerge in round arched shapes, there is hope for harmony and order.

Later life 

With the late seventies enters a maturity of expression. She has devised a style of her own, and there is a stream of larger projects emerging. Another experience awaits her: success with an eager audience. Even though the art market worked in a subversive way, demand surges and is real. She was remembering how she went from never making ends meet and giving away paintings to friends to hiding from persistent buyers and what amounted to a small court of fans. A further milestone was her big solo exhibition at Sala Dalles in 1980. With an anniversary flavor, it produced a shift in her career. The exhibition travels to Cluj-Napoca; smaller excerpts are displayed in other cities. A monograph appears, by Radu Bogdan, a man who dedicated years of his life to the exegesis of an impressionist painter, in an academic study, who is now enthusiastic in a new role of passionate interpreter of this contemporary artist; it is the poetic quality of the text that attracts today, even though it remains the most authoritative scholarly source as well.

The eighties are a time when the government becomes economically and morally bankrupt, and all but abandons art. This confers a freedom in misery, if one asks no subsistence guarantees, and does not openly confront the regime. Underneath the noisy propaganda, one can hover by essentially abstaining from public life. It is a time when most of her work was sold without ever being shown in public, sold from the studio or through a small gallery tolerated in this role, mostly to the visitors and diplomats who realized that in an isolated market they were just living next door to the repository of possibly the most rewarding commodity around: art, from the studios at Pangrati and beyond. Especially diplomats, from the French, Argentine, Greek, Chilean, and Italian consulates and their affiliates, guests and visitors seem to amass a lot of works. Obviously, there are circumstances favoring this, personal taste, and circles of friends. Among more stable buyers tangent to these circles were Marina Dimitropulous (not a diplomat) who has a significant collection of Romanian art, and Geoffrey Tyler, whose collection was recently donated to the University of Tasmania.

In more concerted way, a few galleries emerge, both in Hamburg. Ernst Winter was very interested in Octav's art, but the gallery also organized an exhibition for Năpăruș in 1983. At that time the gallery Mucha was about to start off and it became a significant outlet of the painter in the nineties. There is interest from [gallery in Belgium] and [gallery in Portugal], acquisitions from Italy, Israel and the US, besides the steady Romanian audience.

After 1989, the artist is very productive, but a sense of unease, perhaps the slow onset of a disease, cast a shadow over her work. She is gradually entering depression, even though never fully acknowledged, and fights a deteriorating physical health. None of which prevents her from working.                                                                   

In 1995 she starts having early forms of numbness and at some point she paralyzes from the upper chest down. Her hands, especially the right hand are still free. It is a year of extreme misery, during which she continues working in bed, switching medium for the first time in years. The drawings, watercolors, mixed media on neat 11x17 in. paper from art supplies brought by a faithful friend from Paris, are an emotional tribute to creativity, and the role of art as companion and motivator at the end of life. She was taken almost any freedom away, and any hope, but she drew more than a hundred elaborate, spontaneous works that, if we could forget the circumstances, almost signal a renaissance of her talent. As an artist, this period is significant and the art is not a consolation of greater means: it is as good, only different.

Group exhibitions
 Budapest, Novi-Sad, Belgrade, Zagreb (1966); Prague (1968, 1971); Tel-Aviv, Moscow, Tallinn, Helsinki (1969), Turin (1970); Hague, Middlesbrough, Tyneside, Warsaw, Leningrad (1972); Madrid, Moscow, Washington DC, Montevideo, Buenos Aires, São Paulo, Brasilia, Lima, Ulan Bator, Leipzig, Pyongyang, Chicago, Oshkosh (1973); Caracas, Quebec, Berlin, Athens, Havana, Warsaw (1974); Baghdad, Islamabad (1975); Sofia, Helsinki, Turku, Budapest (1976); Beijing, Shanghai, Lisbon (1977); Lakewood, Milwaukee, Pleven (1978); Ciudad de Mexico, Guadalajara, Madrid, Ottawa, Berlin, Voipaala (1979); Athens (1984); Germany (1991).

Art shows and fairs
Cagnes-sur-Mer (1970);
São Paulo biennale (1971); 
Valparaiso biennale (1983);

Solo exhibitions - selection
Muzeul Țării Crișurilor, Oradea (1976); 
 Sala Dalles, București (1980);
 Muzeul de Artă din Ploiești (1980);  
 Muzeul de Artã din Cluj (1980);
 Galeria Emst Michael Winter, Hamburg (1981);
 Institutul  Italian de culturã, București (1985);
 Institutul francez, București (1992);
 Artexpo - Galeria etaj 3-4 Teatrul Național, București (1994);
 Retrospectiva,  Muzeul Literaturii Române, București (2000);
 Secvențe anii '60-'70, Galeria Veroniki Art, București (2008);

Awards - selection

Revista Arta magazine prize (1968, 1970),
The prize of the Artist Guild (Premiul Uniunii Artiștilor Plastici) (1966),
The Prize of the Sophia Triennale (1982),
Raffaelo prize (1985), 
Special prize of the Jury of the Artist Guild (Premiul special al juriului al U.A.P.) (1991)

Influences 
The artist mentions an attraction for the imagery of Jean Dubuffet and was influenced by Victor Brauner. Romanian traditional embroidery and textile work was not only an influence; enlisting a talented seamstress the painter actually produced a few  artist designed dresses she wore at at least one vernissage. In her studio, a large antique oriental rug was hanging over the sofa and a book about embroidery, as well as a large album on Mughal painting were commonplace. Orthodox Church decoration and painting were subliminally present, as she absorbed its language as a child. Not least, her husband's graphic sensibilities were integrated at maturity and are revealed in almost symbiotic fashion in the last period of her work, when she is immobilized by disease and resumes drawing. Out of a limitation, she releases another expression, interestingly merging stylistically with Octav's, who was already absent since ten years.

Style and technique

(...) Birth, motherhood, nature as determining factors of human condition are themes or thematic interludes - which, considered from the angle of that vigorous vital feeling very characteristic to Georgeta Năpăruș, register the stages of the spring on the ladder of life. It is not surprising that a rather large painting bears the title Efflorescence and imagines - in a lightly solemn view, with pomp and preciousness usually reserved by the painter to spectacular historical invocations - the celebration of the flower of age.

Everything breathes youth, soaring confidence in this image, where the festive shows itself in the form of traditional weaving and the medieval tapestries embroidered with golden thread. Among all the tributes brought to life by the artist, none is imbued by so much gravity, perhaps also because here the facial expressions are very little, and often not at all, charged. The dominants of the coloring - faint green, golden yellow, white and turquoise - as well as the rather severe geometry of the strokes and composition, compete in erudite fashion to offer the painting that celebratory, yet at the same time reservedly effusive, expansiveness.

Almost all characters are female, and many are young mothers with children, lined up neatly, like at a school party. Undoubtedly, Efflorescence is the expression of a mindset exalting beauty, joy of living, linking it primarily to the contribution of young women, of girls and children, in a simultaneous context of motherhood, work and art. Under a different shape and without deviating from the eminence of the plastic language, the ladder of life regains in Georgeta Năpăruș's vision its moral meaning, with each step being illustrated on the arduous and patient way of spiritual ascent. — Radu Bogdan - "Scara Vieții" în Georgeta Năpăruș, 1983.

“(…) Georgeta Năpăruș employed in her artwork a penetrating, ironic intelligence, doubled by sensitiveness, humor, poetry and lucidity and, not least, a deep honesty.

Of course, artistic talent enters decisively! But many are talented. It is rather the primary condition of Art (even though some maintain that one could ignore talent in the presence of genius). Only that Georgeta Naparus has besides talent, in a rare amount, an extra gift of love of the land and its people, she is a genie of the country, she always merges with it.

She does it in such a convincingly-strange way, in an oddly realistic way, and with such a rich and lively fantasy, that she transcends the boundaries of the land, morphing and making it universal. Which explains her growing success, not only here, but also afar. — Radu Bogdan - „Cuvânt de încheiere” în Georgeta Năpăruș, 1983

Notes

Bibliography
Radu Bogdan - Georgeta Năpăruș, Ed. Meridiane, București, 1983
Nina Cassian - Prefață la catalogul expoziției „Georgeta Năpăruș”, Muzeul Țării Crișurilor, Oradea, 1976
C.R. Constantinescu - O artă limpede, accesibilă, profundă, Scânteia tineretului, Sept. 1969
Ion Frunzetti - Logica legendei și basmului, România Literară, Oct. 1971
Constantin Prut - „Georgeta Năpăruș” în Dicționar de Artă Modernă și Contemporană, Editura Albatros, București, 1982, p. 320-321
Georgeta Năpăruș - Catalogul Expoziției „Secvențe anii '60-'70”, Galeria Veroniki Art, București, 2008
Octavian Barbosa - „Georgeta Năpăruș” în Dicționarul artiștilor plastici contemporani,  Editura Meridiane, București, 1976 
Catalogul Expoziției Retrospective Georgeta Năpăruș, Muzeul Literaturii Române, București, 2000 

1930 births
1997 deaths
People from Comarnic
20th-century Romanian painters
Romanian women painters
Bucharest National University of Arts alumni
Burials at Cernica Monastery Cemetery